Genea is a genus of bristle flies in the family Tachinidae. There are about 16 described species in Genea.

Species

References

Further reading

External links

 

Tachininae
Taxa named by Camillo Rondani